Ras Sheehama (born in 1966 in northern Namibia) is a Namibian reggae musician. The political pro-SWAPO  stance of his father forced him into exile in 1979 to Angola and Zambia. There he started to develop his love for the reggae-music and begin to play guitar.  In Zambia for the first time he got in contact with the Rastafari and Reggae culture. During the time at a high school in Lagos, Nigeria between 84 and 88 he played in several Reggae bands. When he returned home in 1990 to witness the first free elections in his home country, he brought huge experiences to Namibia.

Since 1990 he has released several LPs and cassettes which are only available in Namibia and South Africa.  From these tapes several hits were successful continuously in Namibia. Sheehama was able to win several national prices.  The recording band of Ras Sheehama was composed of famous musicians from well-known South African bands Stimela and Bayete which was also of Lucky Dube.  Ras Sheehama is an outstanding singer, who understands to show African joy of life and criticism of the political and social situation of past and future.  Rastafari is always a central point in his songs without becoming pathetic at all.

In the end of May 1999 Ras Sheehama celebrated his first show in Germany together with the former Lucky Dube's Band The Slaves at the Africa Festival in Würzburg, Germany. Ras has performed in Germany, UK,[Cuba], Portugal and Switzerland. He also opened the show for the legendary reggae act Don Carlos in Johannesburg in 2001 and for Manu Di Bango in 1995 in Windhoek.

Ras Sheehama won the Music Award Category for his song Inotela in 1996 which led him to perform at the Music Festival Le Printemps de Bourges in France. In 1997 and thereafter to open for Ismael Lo at the Reunion Island the same year.

In March 2005, Ras launched his fifth album Pure Love followed quickly in June 2006 by his 6th album Travelling On..., a blend of some of Ras's most popular songs spanning two decades.

References

1966 births
Living people
Namibian musicians
Reggae musicians